The Regionalliga West/Südwest was the third tier of the German football league system in the states of Saarland, Rheinland-Pfalz and Nordrhein-Westfalen from 1994 to 2000.

Overview 

The Regionalliga West/Südwest was formed in 1994 to form a regional third level of play between the 2. Bundesliga and the Oberligas Westfalen, Nordrhein and Südwest. The league was made up of 18 clubs, with six each from the three regions it covered. It was formed alongside three other Regionalligas, the Regionalliga Nord, Nordost and Süd. 

The founding members were:

From the 2. Bundesliga:

Rot-Weiß Essen (Oberliga Nordrhein region)

From the Oberliga Westfalen:

Arminia Bielefeld
SC Verl
TuS Paderborn-Neuhaus
SpVgg Erkenschwick
SG Wattenscheid 09 II
Preußen Münster

From the Oberliga Nordrhein:

Wuppertaler SV 
Alemannia Aachen
Bonner SC
Preußen Köln
1. FC Bocholt

From the Oberliga Südwest:

FSV Salmrohr
SV Eintracht Trier 05
Borussia Neunkirchen
SC Hauenstein
SV Edenkoben
VfB Wissen

The number of teams in the league varied, starting its first season (1995) with 18, then 19 (1996), 18 (1997, 1998), 17 (1999), and 20 (2000).

The league winner was always promoted to the 2. Bundesliga; the runners up were also promoted in two of the seasons. The regulation on which of the runners-up of the four Regionalligas went up meant that promotion was allocated in an alternating way. After 1995, it gave the runners-up a chance to gain promotion too via a play-off.

In its final season (2000), Regionalliagas were reduced from four to two. With the exception of the Sportfreunde Siegen, clubs from Nordrhein-Westfalen went to the Regionalliga Nord. The clubs from Rheinland-Pfalz and Saarland went to the Regionalliga Süd.

In 2008, the number of Regionalligas will be expanded from two to three and there will be a new Regionalliga West which will cover exactly the area the old Regionalliga West/Südwest did, but will then be the fourth tier of German football.

Disbanding of the Regionalliga West/Südwest 

When the league was discontinued in 2000, the first two clubs in the league went to the 2. Bundesliga, clubs placed third to twelfth moved to the two remaining Regionalligas, seven to the north and three to the south. The other eight league teams were relegated down to the Oberligas.

To the Regionalliga Nord:

SG Wattenscheid 09 
Fortuna Düsseldorf 
Rot-Weiß Essen 
SC Preußen Münster
SC Verl
Borussia Dortmund II
KFC Uerdingen 05 

To the Regionalliga Süd:

Sportfreunde Siegen
SV Eintracht Trier 05
SV Elversberg

The Sportfreunde Siegen were the oddity in this distribution, being from the state of Nordrhein-Westfalen which had all its clubs in the northern group except the Sportfreunde. The reason for this was the fact that Siegen is in the far south of the state.

Winners and runners-up of the Regionalliga West/Südwest

Source:
All league winners promoted.
In 1996 and 2000, Rot-Weiß Essen and LR Ahlen were also promoted as runners-up.

Placings in the Regionalliga West/Südwest
The following clubs have played in the league and achieved the following final positions:

Source:

Key

Notes
In 1997, TuS Paderborn-Neuhaus was renamed SC Paderborn 07.
In 1999, Wuppertaler SV and FC Homburg were relegated for financial reasons.

References

Sources

External links 
   Das deutsche Fußball Archiv 
 Regionalligas at Fussballdaten.de

West Sudwest
Defunct association football leagues in Germany
Football competitions in North Rhine-Westphalia
Football competitions in Rhineland-Palatinate
Football competitions in Saarland
1994 establishments in Germany
2000 disestablishments in Germany
Sports leagues established in 1994
Sports leagues established in 2000
Ger